Daniela Keller (born 16 April 1985 in Schachen-Reute) is a Swiss former competitive ice dancer. With her brother, Fabian Keller, she is the 2005 Swiss national champion and a five-time junior national champion. They skated in the final segment at five ISU Championships – four World Junior Championships (2001–2004) and the 2005 European Championships in Turin, Italy. They competed in the original dance at the 2005 World Championships in Moscow, Russia.

Programs 
(with Fabian Keller)

Competitive highlights 
(with Fabian Keller)

References

External links
 

Swiss female ice dancers
1985 births
Living people